Boxley is a village and civil parish in the Maidstone District of Kent, England. 

The civil parish has a population of 7,144 (2001 census), increasing to 9,554 at the 2011 Census, and extends to the north and east of the town including the settlements of Boxley itself, Grove Green, most of Weavering Street, Sandling and the southern extremities of Walderslade and Lordswood at the top of Blue Bell Hill.

The M2 and M20 motorways cross the parish to the north and south of the village and the High Speed 1 railway line passes to the south of the village in cuttings and tunnel. Despite being so close to Maidstone and two motorways, the village is surrounded by woodland, and still retains a village feel. The ruins of Boxley Abbey are located here. The parish church is dedicated to St Mary and All Saints.

The church and the Abbey Barn are both Grade I listed buildings and the site of the abbey is a scheduled monument. Boxley Abbey House, Parsonage Farm and St Andrew's Chapel in Boxley and Weavering Manor in Weavering Street are all Grade II* listed. The Pilgrims' Way trackway and the North Downs Way pass through the parish. The village was the filming location for the film version of Porridge.

Within the parish are the Museum of Kent Life and Vinters Valley Nature Reserve. A 19th-century granary from Boxley was dismantled and re-erected at the museum.

"Vinters" was a country house and home to the Whatman family until it was demolished in the 1950s. Susanna Whatman was the first of her family to manage the house and the guide she wrote was published in 1952 - about 200 years after her birth.

References

External links

Boxley Parish Council
Notes on Boxley

Villages in Kent
Civil parishes in Kent